North Dakota was admitted to the Union on November 2, 1889, and elects U.S. senators to Class 1 and Class 3. Its current senators in Congress are Republicans John Hoeven (since 2011) and Kevin Cramer (since 2019). Milton Young was North Dakota's longest-serving senator (1945–1981).

List of senators 

|- style="height:2em"
| colspan=3 | Vacant
| nowrap | Nov 2, 1889 –Nov 25, 1889
| 
| rowspan=3 | 1
| 
| rowspan=2 | 1
| 
| nowrap | Nov 2, 1889 –Nov 25, 1889
| colspan=3 | Vacant

|-
! rowspan=2 | 1
| rowspan=2 align=left | Lyman R. Casey
| rowspan=2  | Republican
| rowspan=2 nowrap | Nov 25, 1889 –Mar 4, 1893
| rowspan=2 | Elected in 1889.Lost renomination.
| Elected in 1889.Lost re-election.
| nowrap | Nov 25, 1889 –Mar 3, 1891
|  | Republican
| align=right | Gilbert A. Pierce
! 1

|- style="height:2em"
| 
| rowspan=3 | 2
| rowspan=3 | Elected in 1891.
| rowspan=9 nowrap | Mar 4, 1891 –Mar 4, 1909
| rowspan=9  | Republican
| rowspan=9 align=right | Henry C. Hansbrough
! rowspan=9 | 2

|- style="height:2em"
! rowspan=3 | 2
| rowspan=3 align=left | William N. Roach
| rowspan=3  | Democratic
| rowspan=3 nowrap | Mar 4, 1893 –Mar 4, 1899
| rowspan=3 | Elected in 1893.

Lost re-election.
| rowspan=3 | 2
| 

|- style="height:2em"
| 

|- style="height:2em"
| 
| rowspan=3 | 3
| rowspan=3 | Re-elected in 1897.

|- style="height:2em"
! rowspan=16 | 3
| rowspan=16 align=left | Porter J. McCumber
| rowspan=16  | Republican
| rowspan=16 nowrap | Mar 4, 1899 –Mar 4, 1923
| rowspan=3 | Elected in 1899.
| rowspan=3 | 3
| 

|- style="height:2em"
| 

|- style="height:2em"
| 
| rowspan=3 | 4
| rowspan=3 | Re-elected in 1903.Lost renomination.

|- style="height:2em"
| rowspan=7 | Re-elected in 1905.
| rowspan=7 | 4
| 

|- style="height:2em"
| 

|- style="height:2em"
| 
| rowspan=7 | 5
| Elected in 1909.Died.
| nowrap | Mar 4, 1909 –Oct 21, 1909
|  | Republican
| align=right | Martin N. Johnson
! 3

|- style="height:2em"
|  
| nowrap | Oct 21, 1909 –Nov 10, 1909
| colspan=3 | Vacant

|- style="height:2em"
| Appointed to continue Johnson's term.Resigned.
| nowrap | Nov 10, 1909 –Jan 31, 1910
|  | Democratic
| align=right | Fountain L. Thompson
! 4

|- style="height:2em"
| Appointed to continue Johnson's term.Lost election to finish Johnson's term.
| nowrap | Feb 1, 1910 –Feb 1, 1911
|  | Democratic
| align=right | William E. Purcell
! 5

|- style="height:2em"
| rowspan=3 | Elected in 1911 to finish Johnson's term, but didn't qualify until resigning from the U.S. House.
| rowspan=6 nowrap | Feb 2, 1911 –Mar 3, 1921
| rowspan=6  | Republican
| rowspan=6 align=right | Asle Gronna
! rowspan=6 | 6

|- style="height:2em"
| rowspan=3 | Re-elected in 1911.
| rowspan=3 | 5
| 

|- style="height:2em"
| 

|- style="height:2em"
| 
| rowspan=3 | 6
| rowspan=3 | Re-elected in 1914.Lost renomination.

|- style="height:2em"
| rowspan=3 | Re-elected in 1916.Lost renomination.
| rowspan=3 | 6
| 

|- style="height:2em"
| 

|- style="height:2em"
| 
| rowspan=5 | 7
| rowspan=3 | Elected in 1920.Died.
| rowspan=3 nowrap | Mar 4, 1921 –Jun 22, 1925
| rowspan=3  | Republican
| rowspan=3 align=right | Edwin F. Ladd
! rowspan=3 | 7

|- style="height:2em"
! rowspan=11 | 4
| rowspan=11 align=left | Lynn Frazier
| rowspan=11  | Republican(NPL)
| rowspan=11 nowrap | Mar 4, 1923 –Jan 3, 1941
| rowspan=5 | Elected in 1922.
| rowspan=5 | 7
| 

|- style="height:2em"
| 

|- style="height:2em"
|  
| nowrap | Jun 22, 1925 –Nov 14, 1925
| colspan=3 | Vacant

|- style="height:2em"
| Appointed to continue Ladd's term.Elected in 1926 to finish Ladd's term.
| rowspan=10 nowrap | Nov 14, 1925 –Jan 3, 1945
| rowspan=10  | Republican
| rowspan=10 align=right | Gerald Nye
! rowspan=10 | 8

|- style="height:2em"
| 
| rowspan=3 | 8
| rowspan=3 | Re-elected in 1926.

|- style="height:2em"
| rowspan=3 | Re-elected in 1928.
| rowspan=3 | 8
| 

|- style="height:2em"
| 

|- style="height:2em"
| 
| rowspan=3 | 9
| rowspan=3 | Re-elected in 1932.

|- style="height:2em"
| rowspan=3 | Re-elected in 1934.Lost renomination.
| rowspan=3 | 9
| 

|- style="height:2em"
| 

|- style="height:2em"
| 
| rowspan=3 | 10
| rowspan=3 | Re-elected in 1938.Lost re-election.

|- style="height:2em"
! rowspan=12 | 5
| rowspan=12 align=left | William Langer
| rowspan=12  | Republican(NPL)
| rowspan=12 nowrap | Jan 3, 1941 –Nov 8, 1959
| rowspan=5 | Elected in 1940.
| rowspan=5 | 10
| 

|- style="height:2em"
| 

|- style="height:2em"
| 
| rowspan=5 | 11
| Elected in 1944.Died.
| nowrap | Jan 3, 1945 –Mar 3, 1945
|  | Democratic
| align=right | John Moses
! 9

|- style="height:2em"
|  
| nowrap | Mar 3, 1945 –Mar 12, 1945
| colspan=3 | Vacant

|- style="height:2em"
| rowspan=3 | Appointed to continue Moses's term.Elected in 1946 to finish Moses's term.
| rowspan=21 nowrap | Mar 12, 1945 –Jan 3, 1981
| rowspan=21  | Republican
| rowspan=21 align=right | Milton Young
! rowspan=21 | 10

|- style="height:2em"
| rowspan=3 | Re-elected in 1946.
| rowspan=3 | 11
| 

|- style="height:2em"
| 

|- style="height:2em"
| 
| rowspan=3 | 12
| rowspan=3 | Re-elected in 1950.

|- style="height:2em"
| rowspan=3 | Re-elected in 1952.
| rowspan=3 | 12
| 

|- style="height:2em"
| 

|- style="height:2em"
| 
| rowspan=6 | 13
| rowspan=6 | Re-elected in 1956.

|- style="height:2em"
| Re-elected in 1958.Died.
| rowspan=6 | 13
| 

|- style="height:2em"
| colspan=3 | Vacant
| nowrap | Nov 8, 1959 –Nov 19, 1959
|  

|- style="height:2em"
! 6
| align=left | Norman Brunsdale
|  | Republican
| nowrap | Nov 19, 1959 –Aug 7, 1960
| Appointed to continue Langer's term.Retired when successor elected.

|- style="height:2em"
! rowspan=17 | 7
| rowspan=17 align=left | Quentin Burdick
| rowspan=17  | Democratic–NPL
| rowspan=17 nowrap | Aug 8, 1960 –Sep 8, 1992
| rowspan=3 | Elected to finish Langer's term.

|- style="height:2em"
| 

|- style="height:2em"
| 
| rowspan=3 | 14
| rowspan=3 | Re-elected in 1962.

|- style="height:2em"
| rowspan=3 | Re-elected in 1964.
| rowspan=3 | 14
| 

|- style="height:2em"
| 

|- style="height:2em"
| 
| rowspan=3 | 15
| rowspan=3 | Re-elected in 1968.

|- style="height:2em"
| rowspan=3 | Re-elected in 1970.
| rowspan=3 | 15
| 

|- style="height:2em"
| 

|- style="height:2em"
| 
| rowspan=3 | 16
| rowspan=3 | Re-elected in 1974.Retired.

|- style="height:2em"
| rowspan=3 | Re-elected in 1976.
| rowspan=3 | 16
| 

|- style="height:2em"
| 

|- style="height:2em"
| 
| rowspan=3 | 17
| rowspan=3 | Elected in 1980.Lost re-election.
| rowspan=3 nowrap | Jan 3, 1981 –Jan 3, 1987
| rowspan=3  | Republican
| rowspan=3 align=right | Mark Andrews
! rowspan=3 | 11

|- style="height:2em"
| rowspan=3 | Re-elected in 1982.
| rowspan=3 | 17
| 

|- style="height:2em"
| 

|- style="height:2em"
| 
| rowspan=6 | 18
| rowspan=5 | Elected in 1986.Retired, then resigned early when elected to the other Senate seat.
| rowspan=5 nowrap | Jan 3, 1987 –Dec 14, 1992
| rowspan=5  | Democratic–NPL
| rowspan=5 align=right | Kent Conrad
! rowspan=5 | 12

|- style="height:2em"
| rowspan=2 | Re-elected in 1988.Died.
| rowspan=6 | 18
| 

|- style="height:2em"
| 

|- style="height:2em"
| colspan=3 | Vacant
| nowrap | Sep 8, 1992 –Sep 16, 1992
|  

|- style="height:2em"
! 8
| align=left | Jocelyn Burdick
|  | Democratic–NPL
| nowrap | Sept 16, 1992 –Dec 14, 1992
| Appointed to continue her husband's term.Retired when successor elected.

|- style="height:2em"
! rowspan=11 | 9
| rowspan=11 align=left | Kent Conrad
| rowspan=11  | Democratic–NPL
| rowspan=11 nowrap | Dec 14, 1992 –Jan 3, 2013
| rowspan=2 | Elected to finish Quentin Burdick's term.
| Appointed to finish Conrad's term, having already been elected to the next term.
| rowspan=10 nowrap | Dec 15, 1992 –Jan 3, 2011
| rowspan=10  | Democratic–NPL
| rowspan=10 align=right | Byron Dorgan
! rowspan=10 | 13

|- style="height:2em"
| 
| rowspan=3 | 19
| rowspan=3 | Elected in 1992.

|- style="height:2em"
| rowspan=3 | Re-elected in 1994.
| rowspan=3 | 19
| 

|- style="height:2em"
| 

|- style="height:2em"
| 
| rowspan=3 | 20
| rowspan=3 | Re-elected in 1998.

|- style="height:2em"
| rowspan=3 | Re-elected in 2000.
| rowspan=3 | 20
| 

|- style="height:2em"
| 

|- style="height:2em"
| 
| rowspan=3 | 21
| rowspan=3 | Re-elected in 2004.Retired.

|- style="height:2em"
| rowspan=3 | Re-elected in 2006.Retired.
| rowspan=3 | 21
| 

|- style="height:2em"
| 

|- style="height:2em"
| 
| rowspan=3 | 22
| rowspan=3 | Elected in 2010.
| rowspan=9 nowrap | Jan 3, 2011 –Present
| rowspan=9  | Republican
| rowspan=9 align=right | John Hoeven
! rowspan=9 | 14

|- style="height:2em"
! rowspan=3 | 10
| rowspan=3 align=left | Heidi Heitkamp
| rowspan=3  | Democratic–NPL
| rowspan=3 nowrap | Jan 3, 2013 –Jan 3, 2019
| rowspan=3 | Elected in 2012.Lost re-election.
| rowspan=3 | 22
| 

|- style="height:2em"
| 

|- style="height:2em"
| 
| rowspan=3 | 23
| rowspan=3 | Re-elected in 2016.

|- style="height:2em"
! rowspan=3 | 11
| rowspan=3 align=left |  Kevin Cramer
| rowspan=3  | Republican
| rowspan=3 nowrap | Jan 3, 2019 –Present
| rowspan=3 | Elected in 2018.
| rowspan=3 | 23
| 

|- style="height:2em"
| 

|- style="height:2em"
| 
| rowspan=3 | 24
| rowspan=3 | Re-elected in 2022.

|- style="height:2em"
| rowspan=3 colspan=5 | To be determined in the 2024 election.
| rowspan=3| 24
| 

|- style="height:2em"
| 

|- style="height:2em"
| 
| 25
| colspan=5 | To be determined in the 2028 election.

See also

 List of United States representatives from North Dakota
 United States congressional delegations from North Dakota
 Elections in North Dakota

Notes

References 

List
Unite States Senators
North Dakota